Im Hyun-sik (born December 31, 1945) is a South Korean actor. He is best known for his leading role in the family drama Three Families Under One Roof (1986-1993), and supporting roles in the period epics Hur Jun (1999) and Dae Jang Geum (2003).

Filmography

Television series

수양산맥 (MBC, 1969)
Chief Inspector (MBC, 1971) (guest)
Tale of Chunhyang (MBC, 1973)
113 수사본부 (MBC, 1974) (guest)
내일이면 (MBC, 1976)
You (MBC, 1977)
산이 되고 강이 되고 (MBC, 1979)
Country Diaries (MBC, 1980) (guest)
알뜰가족 (MBC, 1980)
Royal Emissary (MBC, 1981-1984)
Season of Love (MBC, 1981)
Yesterday and Tomorrow (MBC, 1982)
500 Years of Joseon: The Ume Tree in the Midst of the Snow (MBC, 1984)
MBC Bestseller Theater "Perfect Love" (MBC, 1984)
500 Years of Joseon: The Imjin War (MBC, 1985)
MBC Bestseller Theater "죽은 황녀를 위한 파반느" (MBC, 1986)
Three Families Under One Roof (MBC, 1986-1993)
부초 (MBC, 1987)
Human Market (MBC, 1988)
Teacher, Our Teacher (MBC, 1988)
Our Town (MBC, 1988)
For the Emperor (MBC, 1989)
The Fifth Row (MBC, 1989)
꼴찌 수색대 (MBC, 1990)
Eyes of Dawn (MBC, 1991)
행복어사전 (MBC, 1991)
Winter Story (MBC, 1991)
MBC Best Theater "기찻길 옆 오막살이" (MBC, 1992)
Our Paradise (MBC, 1992)
태평천하 (MBC, 1992)
사랑하는 당신 (SBS, 1992)
Promise (MBC, 1992)
Fifteen in the Family (SBS, 1993)
Sergeant Oh (SBS, 1993)
MBC Best Theater "순달씨와 병구씨와 옥주양" (MBC, 1993)
거인의 손 (MBC, 1994)
Hero's Diary (SBS, 1994)
Lawyer Park Bong-sook (SBS, 1994) (guest)
What Have You Done Yet (SBS, 1994)
우리들의 넝쿨 (SBS, 1995)
Auntie Ok (SBS, 1995)
Inside the Mysterious Mirror (SBS, 1995)
Sandglass (SBS, 1995)
War and Love (MBC, 1995)
Bold Men (KBS2, 1995)
Do You Remember Love? (MBC, 1995)
Expedition of Men (SBS, 1996)
Their Embrace (MBC, 1996)
Im Kkeokjeong (SBS, 1996)
Three Guys and Three Girls (MBC, 1996) (guest)
Medical Brothers (MBC, 1997)
Women (SBS, 1997)
Cinderella (MBC, 1997)
Steal My Heart (SBS, 1998)
Eun-shil (SBS, 1998)
Seven Brides (SBS, 1998)
As We Live Our Lives (KBS2, 1998)
Wave (SBS, 1999)
The Last War (MBC, 1999)
Queen (SBS, 1999)
Rising Sun, Rising Moon (KBS1, 1999)
Hur Jun (MBC, 1999)
Joa Joa (SBS, 2000)
Good Friends (KBS2, 2000)
Rookie (SBS, 2000)
Sweet Bear (MBC, 2001)
Sangdo (MBC, 2001) (cameo)
Splendid Days (SBS, 2001)
Good Friends - Season 2 (KBS2, 2001)
Everyday with You (MBC, 2001)
Sunlight Upon Me (MBC, 2002)
Daemang (Great Ambition) (SBS, 2002)
The Maengs' Golden Era (MBC, 2002)
All In (SBS, 2003)
Forever Love (MBC, 2003)
TV Novel: Buni (KBS1, 2003)
My Fair Lady (SBS, 2003)
Dae Jang Geum (MBC, 2003)
Desert Spring (MBC, 2003)
Dog Bowl (SBS, 2004)
Little Women (SBS, 2004)
The Age of Heroes (MBC, 2004)
Old Miss Diary (KBS2, 2004)
Sad Love Story (MBC, 2005)
Pingguari (SBS, 2005)
Smile of Spring Day (MBC, 2005)
Love Hymn (MBC, 2005)
Ballad of Seodong (SBS, 2005)
Bad Family (SBS, 2006)
The 101st Proposal (SBS, 2006)
Fugitive Lee Doo-yong (KBS2, 2006)
The Return of Shim Chung (KBS2, 2007)
Moon Hee (MBC, 2007)
Legend of Hyang Dan (MBC, 2007)
Lee San, Wind of the Palace (MBC, 2007) (guest)
The Innocent Woman (KBS2, 2007)
The Devil That Pours Red Wine (MBC Every 1, 2007)
Aster (MBC, 2008)
Life Special Investigation Team (MBC, 2008)
Formidable Rivals (KBS2, 2008)
Hong Gil-dong (KBS2, 2008) (cameo)
Chunja's Happy Events (MBC, 2008)
Tazza (SBS, 2008)
Can Anyone Love? (SBS, 2009)
Creating Destiny (MBC, 2009)
I Am Legend (SBS, 2010)
My Girlfriend Is a Gumiho (SBS, 2010) (cameo, ep 1)
Daemul (SBS, 2010)
Pure Pumpkin Flower (SBS, 2010)
The Duo (MBC, 2011)
Gyebaek (MBC, 2011)
If Tomorrow Comes (SBS, 2011)
History of a Salaryman (SBS, 2012) (cameo, ep 1)
Suspicious Family (MBN, 2012)
Arang and the Magistrate (MBC, 2012) (cameo, ep 2)
The Eldest (jTBC, 2013) (cameo)
Steal Heart (jTBC, 2014)

Film
Coffee, Copy, and a Bloody Nose (1994)
Change (1997)
YMCA Baseball Team (2002)
Tube (2003)
Silver Knife (2003) (cameo)
Liar (2004)
The Twins (2005) (cameo)
Mr. Housewife (2005) (cameo)
See You After School (2006) (cameo)
200 Pounds Beauty (2006)
Three Fellas  (2006)
Old Miss Diary - Movie (2006)
Underground Rendezvous (2007)
Oh! My God 2 (2009) (cameo)
Incomplete Life  Prequel (2013)

Variety show/Documentary
Sunday Sunday Night - Ridiculous Movie  (MBC, 1996)
MBC Prime 쌀의 변신 - Narration
Im Hyun-sik's Marketplace of People  (MBC Life, 2009-2012)
영상기록 시간속으로 (KTV, 2012-2013)
With You  (jTBC, 2014)
Oh! My Baby (SBS, 2014)
Master of Living  (SBS, 2014)

Awards
 1977 MBC Drama Awards: Best Supporting Actor (You)
 1987 MBC Drama Awards: Excellence Award, Actor
 1989 25th Baeksang Arts Awards: Most Popular Actor (TV) (Three Families Under One Roof)
 1990 26th Baeksang Arts Awards: Best Actor (TV) (Three Families Under One Roof)
 1990 MBC Drama Awards: Top Excellence Award, Actor (Three Families Under One Roof)
 2000 MBC Drama Awards: Favorite Character Actor of the Year, Viewer's Choice (Hur Jun)
 2002 39th Savings Day: Commendation from the Deputy Prime Minister and the Minister of Finance and Economy
 2003 MBC Drama Awards: Special Acting Award (Dae Jang Geum)
 2004 SBS Drama Awards: Achievement Award (Little Women)

References

External links
 
 
 
 
 

1945 births
Living people
South Korean male television actors
South Korean male film actors
People from North Jeolla Province
Hanyang University alumni